Ashton Historic District is a national historic district located near Port Penn, New Castle County, Delaware, United States. It encompasses six contributing buildings associated with an original settler and his immediate descendants on early land grant in St. Georges Hundred. The three structures associated with the early occupation are the Robert Ashton House, the Joseph Ashton House, and the John Ashton House. The Robert Ashton House, probably the earliest of the group, is a frame, five-bay, single-pile, gambrel-roofed building with shed-roofed
dormers. The Joseph Ashton House, consists of an early-18th-century two-story, three-bay, hall-and-parlor-plan brick structure with a late-18th or early-19th century brick wing. The John Ashton House, consists of a brick, early-18th century two-story, three-bay, hall-and-parlor-plan house with a frame wing.

It was listed on the National Register of Historic Places in 1978.

References

External links

 Robert Ashton House, Road 418, West of Route 9, Port Penn, New Castle County, DE: 2 photos, 3 data pages, and 1 photo caption page at Historic American Buildings Survey

Historic districts on the National Register of Historic Places in Delaware
Buildings and structures in New Castle County, Delaware
National Register of Historic Places in New Castle County, Delaware